Nicut is an unincorporated community and census-designated place in Sequoyah County, Oklahoma, United States. Its population was 360 as of the 2010 census.

History
Nicut was originally named Vrona; its post office changed its name on December 16, 1925. It was named for a "nigh cut", or shortcut, on the road to Muldrow. The community's post office closed on November 30, 1954.

Geography

Demographics

References

Unincorporated communities in Sequoyah County, Oklahoma
Unincorporated communities in Oklahoma
Census-designated places in Sequoyah County, Oklahoma
Census-designated places in Oklahoma